In wrestling, stable has two similar but not entirely consistent meanings:

 In western Pro Wrestling, it means a grouping of wrestlers who compete as a team, see Glossary of professional wrestling terms#stable
 In sumo wrestling, it means a community of professional wrestlers under the same master trainer but who may compete against each other (although competition draws do avoid this as far as possible), and the premises where they live